Donal Joseph Murray (born 1918 in Limerick) was an Irish prelate of the Catholic Church who served as bishop of the Roman Catholic Diocese of Makurdi. He was appointed bishop in 1968. He died in 1999.

References 

1918 births
1999 deaths
Irish expatriate Catholic bishops
Roman Catholic bishops of Makurdi